Congolese embassy may refer to:

List of diplomatic missions of the Democratic Republic of the Congo
List of diplomatic missions of the Republic of the Congo